Lilibeth Rodríguez Morillo (born June 12, 1969 in Caracas) is a Venezuelan singer, songwriter, actress and television host. She is the daughter of singer and actress Lila Morillo and famous singer José Luis Rodríguez "El Puma".

Biography
Lilibeth began her career when she joined the cast of the telenovela Maribel alongside her sister Liliana Rodriguez and mother Lila Morillo.

In 2012, she starred in the Venevisión telenovela Mi ex me tiene ganas where she sang the theme song titled Amor de mis amores.

In 2015, she released her album titled Puerto seguro.

Discography
2015: Puerto seguro

Filmography

Soap operas (telenovelas)

Series 
 Decisiones
  Capítulo: Adictos
  Year: 2005
  Canal: Telemundo
  Lotería
  Capítulo: Dos Evas para un Adrían
  Año: 2006
  Canal: Telemundo

Movies 
 Chao Cristina (RCTV, 2006) – Cristina

Programs 
 Noche de estrellas: Premio lo Nuestro 2004 (2004)
 El gordo y la flaca (2003)

Contests 
 Camino a la fama (2007) – Jurado (Televen)

References

External links
 
 Official website

20th-century Venezuelan women singers
Venezuelan telenovela actresses
Living people
1969 births
Venezuela in the OTI Festival
21st-century Venezuelan women singers